The 407 Transitway is a bus rapid transit system (BRT) being planned along Ontario Highway 407, spanning the Greater Toronto Area between Brant Street in Burlington, and Enfield Road in Durham Region.

Planning for the 407 Transitway has occurred for five segments:

 Brant Street to Hurontario Street
 Hurontario Street to Highway 400  
 Highway 400 to Kennedy Road
 Kennedy Road to Brock Road
 Brock Road to Enfield Road

The Government of Ontario does not intend on opening the segment between Highway 400 to Kennedy Road until 2023. The project is listed in the regional transportation plan The Big Move within the 25-year timeframe.

See also 
 Highway 427 BRT

References

External links
 

Proposed public transport in the Greater Toronto Area
The Big Move projects